Christina is a 1984 erotic B movie film, starring Jewel Shepard, Karin Schubert, produced and written by Harry Alan Towers and directed by Francisco Lara Polop. The film's original Spanish title was Christina y la reconversión sexual.

Plot
Christina Von Belle, a wealthy heiress, is kidnapped by a lesbian terrorist group and held for ransom.  She escapes the lesbian terrorists, only to fall into the clutches of a gang of gourmet chefs, who want a piece of the ransom themselves.

References

External links

1984 films
American erotic thriller films
Spanish erotic thriller films
1980s erotic thriller films
1980s American films